James Smith (born 11 July 1978) is a Scottish footballer who played 'senior' for Queen's Park, East Stirling, Stranraer, Partick Thistle, Brechin City, Dumbarton and Stenhousemuir.

References

1978 births
Scottish footballers
Dumbarton F.C. players
East Stirlingshire F.C. players
Partick Thistle F.C. players
Queen's Park F.C. players
Brechin City F.C. players
Stranraer F.C. players
Stenhousemuir F.C. players
Scottish Football League players
Living people
Association football defenders